Hisar Assembly constituency is one of the 90 Vidhan Sabha constituencies in Haryana state in northern India.

Overview
Hisar, constituency number 52, is one of the seven Assembly constituencies located in Hisar district. This constituency covers the Hisar tehsil.

It is part of Hisar Lok Sabha constituency.

Bhiwani district
Bawani Khera Assembly constituency
 
Jind district 
 Uchana Assembly constituency

Hisar district
 Adampur Assembly constituency
 Hansi Assembly constituency 
 Uklana Assembly constituency 
 Narnaund Assembly constituency
 Nalwa Chaudhry Assembly constituency
 Barwala Assembly constituency
 Hisar Assembly constituency

Members of Legislative Assembly
2014: Kamal Gupta Bhartiya Janata Party
2019: Kamal Gupta Bharatiya Janata Party

See also

 Haryana Legislative Assembly
 Elections in Haryana
 Elections in India
 Lok Sabha
 Rajya Sabha
 Election Commission of India
 Hisar (city)
 Hisar Urban Agglomeration
 Hisar district
 Hisar division
 Hisar (Lok Sabha constituency)
 Asigarh Fort at Hansi

References

External links
 Chief Election Officer, Haryana
 Hisar Vihan Sabha Constituency map

External links
Official website
Map of Haryana Assembly constituencies, created by Haryana Space Applications Centre, Hisar

Assembly constituencies of Haryana
Hisar district